RLS may refer to:

Education 
 Royal Latin School, a grammar school in Buckingham, England
 Stevenson School, formerly Robert Louis Stevenson School, California

Science and technology 
 Recursive least squares filter, in minimisation
 Regularized least squares, for solving least-squares problems
 Reef Life Survey, a marine monitoring program in Tasmania
 Restless legs syndrome, a medical disorder

Other uses 
 Real-life slash, a subgenre of real person fiction
 Rial (disambiguation), plural abbreviation Rls, Middle Eastern currency units
 Robert Louis Stevenson, Scottish writer